The Kanawha Valley prehistoric people were an ancestor group for today's modern American Indian. The Kanawha Valley's paleo-Amerindians came to North America from Siberia over 12,500 years ago.

History
About 12,500 years ago when the land bridge between Siberia and Alaska over the Bering Strait still existed and the oceans were shallower. This was during the end of the last ice age. Then it was much, much colder and there were different types of plants and animals than there are now. The end of the ice age  meant a decline in the population of large game animals like the mastodon and woolly mammoth. As the landscape became warmer and warmer, caribou migrated north to colder temperature.

Food
Kanawha Valley people hunted large game animals, like the woolly mammoth and mastodons. They used spears, with large clovis points knapped from flint. They also hunted smaller animals ranging from deer and bears to rabbits and birds. They also gathered nuts and edible plants. They traveled a lot because they followed the animals that they hunted. Later on, they fished from the river.

Change
When the larger game animals died out, and the climate warmed, they had to adapt. The large game and caribou were replaced by an abundance of deer. Instead of following their prey, the Kanawha valley prehistoric peoples stayed in more permanent homes and let the deer come to them. As the larger game died out the Kanawha valley people began to use smaller weapon points and adapted their hunting patterns to suit the new prey.

The Atlatl
The atlatl was a revolutionary advancement in hunting. The tool itself much resembles a modern dog toy. The spear was attached to a lever, and placed parallel of the lever. The lever would be flung forward and the spear hurled with much more force and accuracy.

Houses
The people lived in wigwams, which were constructed from sticks. The poles were stuck into the ground, bent and tied together at the top to produce a domed frame with panels of sticks lashed together to make walls.

Later on
They discovered seeds and soon grew their own crops, still hunting and fishing to supplement their diet. Also they made the bow and arrow. Although generally they did not form large settlements, later some groups banded together and formed larger villages which were planned constructions. The larger villages were built on terraces beside the river. These larger settlement dwellers relied on fishing and not agriculture—they died out.

References

Native American tribes in West Virginia